Cephalopentandra is a genus of flowering plants belonging to the family Cucurbitaceae.

Its native range is Northeastern Tropical Africa.

Species:
 Cephalopentandra ecirrhosa (Cogn.) C.Jeffrey

References

Cucurbitaceae
Cucurbitaceae genera